The Polish American Football League or shortly PLFA was a structured system for the American football competitions in Poland founded in 2004 by the Polish federation PZFA. In 2012, the Topliga was created as a major league with a bid (invitation) rule. The remaining teams are divided into two leagues (PLFA I and PLFA II) between which there was promotion and relegation. There were two eight-man football competitions: PLFA 8 for reserve teams and smaller clubs, and PLFA J for under-17 players.

The top four teams from the Topliga regular season entered the playoffs and the winners met in the championship game called the SuperFinał (more commonly known as the Polish Bowl). The PLFA I championship game was called the PLFA Cup Game.

In the 2013 season there were 74 teams in 5 leagues. 57 teams played 11-man football (8 teams in the Topliga, 8 teams in the PLFA I and 21 teams in the PLFA II) and other 37 teams played 8-man football competitions: 20 senior teams and 17 junior teams). The TopLiga and PLFA I are divided into two divisions, PLFA II into three divisions, and PLFA 8 and PLFAJ into five divisions based on geographical reasons.

After the 2017 season, there was a split in Polish American football, 20 clubs left the PLFA and founded a new league, the Liga Futbolu Amerykańskiego  or shortly LFA.

History 

American football is arguably the fastest growing sport in Poland, which appeared in Poland in 1999, when a pioneer initiative was established in Warsaw. The Polish American Football Association ( or PZFA) was created in November 2004, initiated by the first two American football teams: Warsaw Eagles and 1. KFA Wielkopolska. Its founding was a response to the dynamic growth of the American football movement in Poland.

The first game between Polish teams (still without professional equipment) was played in December 2005 in Poznań. The first international game, officiated by professionals, was played in March 2006 – The Warsaw Eagles took on Czech team Pardubice Stallions in a game played in Warsaw. From that moment on, teams began to be established in different parts of the country.

The Polish American Football League started in October 2006 with just 4 teams. There were 9 teams competing for the second championship in 2007. In 2008, the league split into two divisions - PLFA I (8 teams) and PLFA II (9 teams). There were 22 teams competing for the 2009 season and 21 for the 2010 season. 2011- 34 teams, 2012- 42 teams, and 2013- 74 teams.

Season structure
The regular season in the Topliga starts in March/April and ends in June/July. Each team plays nine games competing against every other team in the division (4 or 5 home games and 5 or 4 away games). A team is awarded two points for a win, one point for a tie, and zero points for a loss (a tie only occurs if the overtime can not be played). 

After a regular season, the top four teams qualify for the play-offs (1st place against 4th place and 2nd against 3rd) and the Semi-Final winners meet in the championship game called SuperFinal; there is no 3rd place game. 

The 2012 Super-Final championship game drew 23,000 fans.

Game rules

Playing rules are based on those of the NCAA College football with minor modifications, e.g.:
 12-minute quarters
 minimal field markings
 unsportsmanlike conduct for excessive celebration after plays, similar to the NFL rules
 no Instant replay
Rules are adopted with a one-year delay. For example, 2011 NCAA game rule changes was adopted for 2012 PLFA season.

Before 2012, coaches, players and officials used the English-language NCAA Rulebook. In February 2012, the Rulebook was translated into Polish by the Officiating Department chairman.

Teams in 2019 Season

Champions

See also
Sport in Poland

References

External links
 Polish American Football League

 

 
2006 establishments in Poland
Sports leagues established in 2006
American football in Poland
Defunct American football leagues in Europe
Professional sports leagues in Poland